Bas Drijver is a Dutch professional bridge player who plays for Switzerland. He is known for his successful partnership with Sjoert Brink.

Bridge accomplishments

Wins

 Bermuda Bowl (2) 2011, 2022 
 World Bridge Games (1) 2016 
 North American Bridge Championships (3)
Reisinger (1) 2018
Spingold Knockout Teams (1) 2019
Soloway Knockout Teams (1) 2019

Runners-up

 World Olympiad Teams Championship (1) 2004
 North American Bridge Championships (4)
 Jacoby Open Swiss Teams (1) 2011 
 Blue Ribbon Pairs (1) 2010 
 Reisinger (1) 2019 
 Vanderbilt (1) 2013

Notes

External links
 
 

Dutch contract bridge players
Bermuda Bowl players
Living people
Year of birth missing (living people)